Giacomo Guido Ottonello (born 29 August 1946) is an Italian prelate of the Catholic Church who has spent his career in the diplomatic service of the Holy See. He was Apostolic Nuncio to Slovakia from 2017 to 2021 and Nuncio to Ecuador from 2005 to 2017.

Biography
Giacomo Guido Ottonello was born in Masone, in the Province of Genoa, on 29 August 1946. He was ordained a priest of the Diocese of Acqui on 29 June 1961. On 25 March 1980 he entered the diplomatic service of the Holy See, working in Pakistan, El Salvador, Lebanon, France, Spain and Poland.

He earned a licentiate in canon law and then studied at the Pontifical Ecclesiastical Academy.  He earned a doctorate in theology at the Pontifical Lateran University.

On 29 November 1999, Pope John Paul II appointed him apostolic nuncio to Panama and titular archbishop of Sasabe.

On 26 February 2005, John Paul named him Nuncio to Ecuador, where for over twelve years he attempted dialogue and mediation with the  anticlerical President Rafael Correa,

On 1 April 2017, Pope Francis appointed him apostolic nuncio to Slovakia. And he accepted his resignation on 31 October 2021.

See also
 List of heads of the diplomatic missions of the Holy See

References

External links
 Catholic Hierarchy: Archbishop Giacomo Guido Ottonello

Living people
1946 births
Pontifical Lateran University alumni
Pontifical Ecclesiastical Academy alumni
Apostolic Nuncios to Panama
Apostolic Nuncios to Ecuador
Apostolic Nuncios to Slovakia